Titus 2 is the second chapter of the Epistle to Titus in the New Testament of the Christian Bible. The letter is traditionally attributed to Paul the Apostle, sent from Nicopolis of Macedonia (Roman province), addressed to Titus in Crete. Some scholars argue that it is the work of an anonymous follower, written after Paul's death in the first century AD. This chapter describes the qualities of members of the community and doctrinal statements regarding the death of Christ in relation to the removal of sin.

Text
The original text was written in Koine Greek. This chapter is divided into 15 verses.

Textual witnesses
Some early manuscripts containing the text of this chapter are:
Papyrus 32 (~AD 200; extant verses 3–8)
Codex Sinaiticus (330–360)
Codex Alexandrinus (400–440)
Codex Ephraemi Rescriptus (~450; complete)
Codex Freerianus (~450; extant verses 4–6, 14–15)
Codex Claromontanus (~550)
Codex Coislinianus (~550; extant verses 1–5)

Membership of the community (2:1–10) 
Verses 1–10 contain an injunction to Titus to teach 'sound doctrine' to the community with a list of qualities and duties for the members, in contrast to the "unseemly doctrine" highlighted in chapter 1. 1 Timothy 1:10 uses the same term, 'sound doctrine'.

Doctrinal statements (2:11–15)
The doctrinal statements in this part are typical of Paul's teaching which links the incarnation and sacrifice of Christ to the hope and expectation of his second coming.

Verse 14

"A peculiar people": translated from the Greek phrase , which is only found here in the whole New Testament, but is used multiple times in Greek Septuagint version of some Old Testament (Hebrew Bible) verses to translate the Hebrew phrase  (Exodus 19:5 , 'a peculiar treasure' (KJV); Deuteronomy 7:6 , 'special people' (KJV); Deuteronomy 14:2 , 'a peculiar people' (KJV); Deuteronomy 26:18 , 'peculiar people' (KJV)).

Verse 15

This summary command to Titus contains previously mentioned three didactic terms:
 "speak/teach" (in 2:1) about "these things", referring to the matters in the preceding paragraphs (2:1–14)
 "exhort/encourage" (in 2:6)
 "rebuke/reproof" (in 1:13)
recalling 'the job description of the overseer' (1:9) which Titus must do himself.

Philip Towner offers a paraphrase:

See also
 Jesus
 Related Bible parts: 1 Timothy 3

References

Bibliography

External links
 King James Bible - Wikisource
English Translation with Parallel Latin Vulgate
Online Bible at GospelHall.org (ESV, KJV, Darby, American Standard Version, Bible in Basic English)
Multiple bible versions at Bible Gateway (NKJV, NIV, NRSV etc.)

02